The 1923 Green Bay Packers season was their fifth season overall and their third season in the National Football League. The team finished with a 7–2–1 record under player/coach Curly Lambeau earning them third place. This was the Packers first season in Bellevue Park.

Schedule

 Game in italics is against a non-league team.

Standings

References
 Sportsencyclopedia.com
 1923 Green Bay Packers season

Green Bay Packers seasons
Green Bay Packers
Green Bay Packers